Stone is a village in the Borough of Dartford in Kent, England. It is located 2.5 miles east of Dartford.

History
Iron Age pottery and artefacts have been found here proving it to be an ancient settlement site. The 13th-century parish church, dedicated to St Mary the Virgin at Stone, was known as the "Lantern of Kent" from its beacon light known to all sailors on the river. It is one of Kent's most dramatic churches and is renowned for its Gothic sculpture made by the masons who built Westminster Abbey.  The Grade I listing entry narrates each spandrel is either identical or almost identical to those at Westminster Abbey and therefore also dates to 1260, it also describes the North Chapel built for Sir Richard Wiltshire's death in 1527 

The parish (including Bean) was part of Axstane Hundred and later Dartford Rural District.

Stone Castle

Located about a mile to the south of Greenhithe and just north of the Roman Watling Street, Stone Castle dates from the mid-11th century, and is thought to have been constructed without licence during the reign of King Stephen, but was later permitted to remain by King Henry II after his accession to the throne.

The castle was built almost entirely of flint. The only surviving portion of the original medieval castle intact is its large rectangular tower, rising 40 feet in height. An adjoining Georgian house was built onto the tower by Sir Richard Wiltshire; in 1527 Cardinal Wolsey stayed at his house while passing through the district. In more recent times the property has belonged to the Church of England.

Today
Stone Castle is now the regional office of a large cement manufacturer. The cement works, which once stood here, have been demolished.

The disused John's Hole Quarry at Stone was used as a filming location for the mine scenes in the Doctor Who television story The Dalek Invasion of Earth. It was the first of many quarries to be used in the series.

Sports 
Stone has a village cricket team that was established in 1888.

Bluewater Shopping Centre
Bluewater Shopping Centre is located in Stone and is the fourth largest shopping centre in the United Kingdom. It was opened on 16 March 1999 and is located in a former chalk quarry. The site occupies 240 acres and has a sales floor area of 1,600,000 ft2. The centre employs 7,000 people and serves over 27 million visitors a year.

Demography

At the 2001 UK census, the Stone electoral ward had a population of 6,252.

The ethnicity was 95.9% white, 0.9% mixed race, 1.6% Asian, 1.3% black and 0.3% other. The place of birth of residents was 94.8% United Kingdom, 0.8% Republic of Ireland, 0.9% other Western European countries, and 3.5% elsewhere. Religion was recorded as 71% Christian, 0.2% Buddhist, 0.4% Hindu, 0.5% Sikh and 0.3% Muslim. 17.4% were recorded as having no religion, 0.2% had an alternative religion and 9.9% did not state their religion.

The economic activity of residents aged 16–74 was 49.7% in full-time employment, 10.8% in part-time employment, 6.9% self-employed, 3.1% unemployed, 1.8% students with jobs, 1.6% students without jobs, 10.1% retired, 7.7% looking after home or family, 4.8% permanently sick or disabled and 3.5% economically inactive for other reasons. The industry of employment of residents was 22% retail, 14.6% manufacturing, 10% construction, 10.6% real estate, 10.2% health and social work, 5.6% education, 9% transport and communications, 3.8% public administration, 3.4% hotels and restaurants, 4.5% finance, 0.6% agriculture and 5.7% other. Of the ward's residents aged 16–74, 12% had a higher education qualification or the equivalent, compared with 19.9% nationwide.

Transport

Rail
Stone Crossing railway station serves the village with National Rail services to Luton via Woolwich Arsenal and London St Pancras, London Charing Cross via Sidcup, Gravesend and Rainham.

Buses
Stone is served by London Buses route 492, Arriva Kent Thameside routes A, 477 and 480 and Ensignbus route X80. These connect it with Bexleyheath, Bluewater, Dartford, Gravesend, Lakeside, Orpington, Sidcup and Swanley.

References

External links

Parish Council website

Villages in Kent
Borough of Dartford
Populated places on the River Thames
Civil parishes in Kent